Acleris nigrolinea is a species of moth of the family Tortricidae. It is found in North America, where it has been recorded from Alberta, Arizona, British Columbia, California, Colorado, Indiana, Maine, Manitoba, Maryland, Michigan, Minnesota, New Brunswick, New Hampshire, North Carolina, Ontario, Pennsylvania, Quebec, Tennessee, West Virginia and Wisconsin.

The wingspan is 22–27 mm. The forewings are light grey, with numerous scale-tufts. In the west, form ferruginiguttana occurs. This form has much deeper blue-grey forewings, variably mottled and suffused with smoky shades and often with small sub-basal and median dark patches in the fold. Adults have been recorded on wing nearly year round depending on the location.

The larvae feed on Betula alleghaniensis, Betula papyrifera, Prunus virginiana, Populus balsamifera, Populus tremuloides, Abies, Pinus and Salix species.

References

Moths described in 1869
nigrolinea
Moths of North America